King Biscuit Flower Hour  is a live album by David Crosby.  Although it was released in 1996, it is a recording of a concert that occurred in 1989.

Track listing
"Tracks in the Dust"  – 6:09
"Guinnevere"  – 5:06
"Compass"  – 4:22
"In My Dreams"  – 4:42
"Drive My Car"  – 3:50
"Lady of the Harbor"  – 3:39
"Oh Yes I Can"  – 5:44
"Monkey and the Underdog"  – 4:22
"Delta"  – 5:13
"Déjà Vu"  – 7:48
"Night Time for the Generals"  – 3:37
"Wooden Ships"  – 8:03
"Almost Cut My Hair"  – 5:16
"Long Time Gone"  – 5:51

All tracks written by David Crosby, except 6, 8 and 11 by David Crosby and Craig Doerge and track 12 by David Crosby, Paul Kanter and Stephen Stills

Live Track listing
"Tracks in the Dust"
"Compass"
"Delta" 
"Déjà Vu" 
"Almost Cut My Hair" 
"Guinnevere" 
"Lady of the Harbor" 
"Oh Yes I Can" 
"Wooden Ships" 
"Long Time Gone"

From The Front Row...Live! Track listing
"Drive My Car"
"Lady of the Harbor"
"Oh Yes I Can" 
"Monkey and the Underdog"
"Delta"
"In My Dreams"
"Wooden Ships" 
"Almost Cut My Hair" 
"Long Time Gone" 
"Déjà Vu" 
"Night Time for the Generals"
"Tracks in the Dust" 
"Guinnevere" 
"Compass"

Personnel 
 David Crosby – lead vocals, guitars
 Dan Dugmore – guitars
 Mike Finnigan – keyboards, backing vocals
 Davey Faragher – bass, backing vocals
 Jody Cortez – drums

Production
 Executive Producer – Felix B. Mangione
 Production Coordination – Jack Ball and Steve Fish
 Mixed and Mastered by Glen Robinson at Studio Victor (Montreal, Quebec).
 Digital Editing – Ferand  Martel
 Design – Barefoot Design
 Cover Photo – Murray Close
 Inside Photo – Chuck Pulin and David Seelig
 Tray Card Photo – Michael Spilotro
 Liner Notes – Bruce Pilato

References

1996 live albums
David Crosby live albums